The Desert Island is a 1936 Chinese crime thriller film directed by Wu Yonggang.

Cast 
Jin Yan
Zhang Zhizhi

External links 

1936 films
1930s Mandarin-language films
Chinese black-and-white films
1936 crime films
Films directed by Wu Yonggang
Chinese crime films